Burn The Maps is the fifth studio album by The Frames, released in Ireland on Plateau Records on 17 September 2004 and worldwide on ANTI- Records on 8 February 2005.

This was their first studio album to go to #1 in the Irish Album Charts.
The songs "Fake", "Finally" & "Sideways Down" became their highest charting hits, reaching 4, 6, and 10 respectively.

Track listing
 "Happy"
 "Finally"
 "Dream Awake"
 "A Caution to the Birds"
 "Trying"
 "Fake"
 "Sideways Down"
 "Underglass"
 "Ship Caught in the Bay"
 "Keepsake"
 "Suffer in Silence"
 "Locusts"

The song "Dream Awake" was featured in the NBC drama series Life at the end of series premiere and "Finally" is featured at the end of episode 11 of the first season, "Fill It Up".

Chart positions

References

External links
The Frames: Burn the Maps 

2005 albums
Anti- (record label) albums
The Frames albums